Smells Like Teen Punk Meat is the third single and second extended play by American industrial rock band Snake River Conspiracy, released exclusively in the United Kingdom on July 31, 2000 by Morpheus Records.

The single's A-side is "Somebody Hates You", from the band's debut album Sonic Jihad, and its B-side is a remix of "Breed" by Loadblower. The CD version of Smells Like Teen Punk Meat contains a new song, "Homicide", as well as an uncensored, enhanced CD video of "Vulcan".

Although Smells Like Teen Punk Meat was marketed as an extended play, it is generally classified as a single under Official Charts Company (OCC) rules.

Smells Like Teen Punk Meat was named "Single of the Week" by British music magazine Kerrang!.

Track listing

Personnel 
Personnel per liner notes.

Snake River Conspiracy

 Jason Slater – bass, guitar, instruments, production, mixing, songwriting (all tracks), remixing (2)
 Tobey Torres – lyrical contributions (uncredited), vocals

Production

 Eric Valentine – production, mixing, song writing (1, 2)
 David Kahne – production, mixing orchestral arrangements, songwriting 
 Geoff Tyson – engineering (2,3), remixing (2), songwriting (3)
 Krish Sharma – mixing (1)
 Brian Gardener – mastering
 Loadblower  – remixing (2)

Artwork

 Michael Kahne – art direction, design, illustrations

Charts

References
https://www.amazon.co.uk/Smells-Like-Snake-River-Conspiracy/dp/B00004Y1NB

Albums produced by David Kahne
Albums produced by Jason Slater
Albums produced by Eric Valentine
2000 EPs
Snake River Conspiracy albums